The 1898 Jubilee Medal was a military and civil decoration of Austria-Hungary established in 1898 and awarded for the anniversary of Emperor Franz Josef accession to the throne of the Habsburg Empire.

History
The 1898 Jubilee Medal was created by Emperor Franz Josef on 2 December 1898 in order to commemorative medal the mark the 50th anniversary of his accession to the throne of the Habsburg Empire

The medal was 34–35 mm in diameter. The obverse of the cross bore the portrait of Emperor Franz Josef. On the reverse is written MDCCCXLLVIII-MDCCCXCVIII (1848–1898) in a laurel wreath. The medal is suspended from a red trifold ribbon for the armed forces and red white for civilians.

The cross came in three versions:
Military Jubilee Medal for the armed forces – Jubiläums-Erinnerungsmedaille für die bewaffnete Macht und die Gendarmerie  (special award in gold)
Military Jubilee Medal for the armed forces – Jubiläums-Erinnerungsmedaille für die bewaffnete Macht und die Gendarmerie (general bronze medal)
Jubilee Medal for civilian servants – Jubiläums-Erinnerungsmedaille für Zivilstaatsbedienstete (bronze medal)

Endnotes

Orders, decorations, and medals of Austria-Hungary
Awards established in 1898